Giovanni Bartolucci (born 27 February 1984) is an Italian footballer who plays for Gubbio as a defender.

Career
A youth product of Fiorentina, Bartolucci made his Serie A debut on 10 June 2001, in a 0–3 away loss to Lazio. Bartolucci signed for Juventus on a free transfer in 2002. Bartolucci was sent on loan to Crotone in 2004, along with Guzman, Konko, Paro Mirante and Gastaldello.

Siena
Bartolucci was sent on loan to Siena in 2006, with Gastaldello, Konko, Masiello and Packer. Siena also holds half of the players' rights.

He joined Monza on loan in August 2007. He was later sent on loan to Pistoiese, Lecco and Gubbio. Bartolucci joined Gubbio on a free transfer in the summer of 2011.

Honours
Fiorentina
Coppa Italia: 2000–01

References

External links
 Profile at A.C. Monza Brianza
 Profile at tuttocalciatori.net

1984 births
Living people
Italian footballers
Italy youth international footballers
ACF Fiorentina players
Pisa S.C. players
F.C. Crotone players
Juventus F.C. players
A.C.N. Siena 1904 players
A.C. Monza players
U.S. Pistoiese 1921 players
A.S. Gubbio 1910 players
Serie A players
Serie B players
Serie C players
Association football defenders
Sportspeople from the Province of Arezzo
S.E.F. Torres 1903 players
Footballers from Tuscany